Curtis William Markham (born September 21, 1959) is a former NASCAR driver who raced in all three top series.

Born in Richmond, Virginia, Markham made his Busch debut in 1983 driving the #94 Frank Edwards Pontiac with a best finish of 18th in three starts.  In 1984 he made one start in the #85 J.R. Racing Olds and finished 13th.  In 1987, he made his Winston Cup debut with Wayne Beahr in his #37 Hanover Printing Ford and finished 38th.  In 1989, he drove the #88 Buick in 2 Busch races.  In 1991 he drove the #75 Food Country USA Olds owned by Charlie Henderson to an 8th-place finish at Watkins Glen (BGN).  The next year he drove the #7 Skoal Bandit Pontiac to a 5th-place finish at Loudon (BGN). He was 1992 Rookie of the Year in the #7 Skoal car in the Busch North Series. He qualified on the pole in the Busch North Series several times. In 1994, he attempted four cup races, but only made one in the #02 T.W. Taylor Ford sponsored by Children's Miracle Network and got a DNF.  In 1995, he drove the #63 Lysol Pontiac owned by Hubert Hensley in his first full BGN season and got his first pole.  He finished 15th in the points with six top-ten finishes.  In his second full season with the #63 he improved to 11th in the points with seven top tens.  In 1997 he ran three races and came home fifth at Loudon; he also came in third at Phoenix in the #32 truck.  The next year, he drove the #64 Schneider Chevy to three top-ten finishes.  In 1999 he drove the #29 and #72 Chevys with a best finish of 12th. In 2000 he made his last start with the #4 Joe Gibbs Pontiac sponsored by Porter-Cable and ran 17th at the Glen.

He is currently the shop foreman for Joe Gibbs Racing. After hiring Denny Hamlin, he is also spotting for him and has spotted for several other NASCAR drivers.

Motorsports career results

NASCAR
(key) (Bold – Pole position awarded by qualifying time. Italics – Pole position earned by points standings or practice time. * – Most laps led.)

Winston Cup Series

Busch Series

Craftsman Truck Series

Busch North Series

ARCA Permatex SuperCar Series
(key) (Bold – Pole position awarded by qualifying time. Italics – Pole position earned by points standings or practice time. * – Most laps led.)

References

External links
 

NASCAR drivers
1959 births
Living people
Sportspeople from Richmond, Virginia
Racing drivers from Virginia